Bomarea is one of the two major genera in the plant family Alstroemeriaceae. Most occur in the Andes, but some occur well into Central America, Mexico and the West Indies. Some species are grown as ornamental plants.

These plants are similar to their relatives in Alstroemeria, but many take a twining form. Others stand freely upright. A distinctive morphological trait of most, if not all, Alstroemeriaceae is resupinate leaves. The blades twist from the base, taking an upside-down position on the stems.

Bomarea is divided into four subgenera, Baccata, Bomarea, Sphaerine, and Wichuraea. The largest is Bomarea with about 70 species.

There are about 110 to 122 species in the genus.

Species
Species accepted as of July 2014:

References

 
Liliales genera